The Coombs Hills are an area of broken and largely snow-free hills and valleys between Odell Glacier and Cambridge Glacier in Victoria Land. They were discovered in 1957 by the New Zealand Northern Survey Party of the Commonwealth Trans-Antarctic Expedition (1956–58) and named by them for D.S. Coombs, professor of geology at the University of Otago, New Zealand, who assisted the expedition in obtaining essential petrological equipment.

Geology
Mount Brooke and the Jurassic Mawson Formation dominate the southwest end of Coombs Hills.  The Jurassic Ferrar Dolerite outcrops to the east, encompassing pockets of the Triassic Lashly Formation.

External links
USGS topographic map of Coombs Hills

References

 

Hills of Oates Land